Woodridge State High School is a co-educational, state secondary school in Woodridge, a suburb of Logan, Queensland, Australia. The school opened in 1972, and currently has an enrolment of 1200 students (as of May 2016). While the school and suburb is based in the Logan Local Government Area, many of its students are from suburbs in the general Greater Brisbane Area. The current principal is Kathleen Janecek.

History 
Woodridge State High School opened in 1972 during a period of rapid increase in primary school enrolment in the Woodridge area. The school built its community hall in 1976. In 2017, Woodridge State High School celebrated its 45th anniversary of educating students since its opening in 1972.

Sport 
As with many Queensland state schools, Woodridge State High runs annual swimming, athletics and cross country carnivals, giving students the opportunity to become Age Champion to progress to district carnivals
In addition, the school participates in an inter-school sports program, where schools in the district are pitted against each other. Winners may progress to the district premiers, and then to the Metropolitan finals. In adherence with the seasons, different sports are played during the Summer and Winter months.

Cultural 
The school claims it hosts students from over 60 cultural backgrounds. The school hosted a talk by 2016 Australian of the Year David Morrison in line with its Harmony Day events.

See also 
 Lists of schools in Queensland
 Education in Australia

References 

Public high schools in Queensland
Schools in Logan City
Educational institutions established in 1972
1972 establishments in Australia